The 2007 Florida Atlantic Owls baseball team was the intercollegiate baseball team of Florida Atlantic University.  It competed on the Division I level in the Sun Belt Conference.  The 2007 team marked the first season of baseball to compete in the Sun Belt, as last year the Owls played in the Atlantic Sun Conference.  After a disappointing 2006 season, FAU looked to bounce back in 2007, hoping to return to Regionals - possibly farther.  However, the first season in the Sun Belt did not live up to expectations in Boca Raton, and the Owls finished the regular season at .500 in conference and were bounced from the Sun Belt Conference Tournament in their third game.  For a second straight season, FAU would not reach the Regionals.

2007 schedule and results

2007 Roster

Starting lineup
Starters based on number of games started at each position.
Center Field: 13 Marion Streptfert (So.)
Second Base: 13 Kyle Doherty(Fr.)
Right Field: 12 Robbie Widlansky (Jr.)
Left Field: 25 Mike McKenna (Jr.)
Third Base: 13 Alfonzo Gonzales (So.)
Catcher: 11 Justin Martin (Sr.)
Designated Hitter: 4 Tyler Stevens (Sr.)
First Base: 19 Travis Ozga (So.)
Shortstop: 14 Nick Arata (Sr.)

Reserves
 5 Ryan Cheatham (Fr.)
22 Billy Degnan (Jr.)
23 Justin Ferreira (Jr.)
44 Riaan Spanjer-Furstenburg (Fr.)

Pitchers
 7 Mickey Storey (Jr.)
16 Mike Obradovich (Jr.)
17 Joel Schmal (Sr.)
18 Brett Cannon (Jr.)
24 Alex Pepe (So.)
26 Lou Morey (Fr.)
27 Chris Eberhart (Jr.)
30 Brandon Cooney (Sr.)
31 Andrew Tomlin (Sr.)
32 Justin Phillabaum (Jr.)
33 Anthony Bradley (Sr.)
34 Chris Salberg (Sr.)
36 Mike Salivar (Jr.)
49 Brandon Kloess (Sr.)

Team leaders
Minimum to qualify in statistics: 1.0 inning/game played or game pitched.

Offense
Average: Robbie Widlansky (.433)
Runs batted in: Robbie Widlansky (69)
Home runs: Williams Block (18)
Hits: Robbie Widlansky (104)
Doubles: Robbie Widlansky (24)
Triples: Williams Block / Daniel Bomback (3)
Runs: Daniel Bomback (67)
Walks: Mike McKenna (36)
Stolen bases: Daniel Cook (15)
On-base percentage: Robbie Widlansky (.498)
Slugging percentage: Robbie Widlansky (.729)

Pitching
Wins: Mike Obradovich (9)
Earned run average: Chris Salberg (3.05)
Innings pitched: Chris Salberg (100.1)
Saves: Mike Obradovich (3)
Appearances: Chris Salberg (25)
Games started: Mike Obradovich (13)
Complete games: Mike Obradovich / Chris Salberg (2)
Earned runs: Alex Pepe (18)
Strikeouts: Chris Salberg (124)

Defense
Percentage: Travis Ozga (.990)
Putouts: Travia Ozga (365)
Assists: Daniel Bomback (158)
Chances: Travis Ozga (405)
Errors: Chris Salberg (1)
Double-plays: Daniel Bomback (27)

Awards and honors

All-American
Junior outfielder Robbie Widlansky was named a 2007 Louisville Slugger All-American, becoming the 11th FAU baseball player to be honored as an All-American.

Conference Player of the Year
Robbie Widlansky was named the 2007 Sun Belt Conference Player of the Year.  Widlansky finished the 2007 season with a .433 batting average, 15 home runs, 69 RBIs, and started all 55 games for the Owls.  Widlansky broke FAU single season records for: hits (101) and total bases (170).

All-Conference
First Team All-Conference Honors
3B Williams Block (Sophomore)
OF Robbie Widlansky (Junior)
Second Team All-Conference Honors
SP Chris Salberg (Senior)
OF Mike McKenna (Junior)
OF Daniel Cook (Junior)

Batting Champion
Robbie Widlansky won the Sun Belt Conference Batting Title (.433).

Records broken in 2007
2007 saw a handful of school records broken.
Junior outfielder Robbie Widlansky broke the single-season batting record (.430).
Junior outfielder Mike McKenna joined Widlansky to mark the first time two Owls would bat over .400 in a single-season (.414).
Widlansky broke the single-season school record for hits (101) and total bases (170).

2007 MLB First-Year Player Draft
Owls selected in the 2007 MLB First-Year Player Draft:

Notes and references

External links
 Sun Belt Conference Baseball Statistics
 Official FAU Owls Baseball Homepage 
 NCAA Baseball National Polls

Florida Atlantic Owls baseball seasons
Florida Atlantic
Florida Atlantic Owls baseball